Finder may refer to:

 Finder (surname)
 Finder (software), part of the Apple Macintosh operating system
 Finder (comics), a comic book series by Carla Speed McNeil
 Finder (novel), a 1994 novel by Emma Bull
 Finder Wyvernspur, a fictional deity of the Forgotten Realms universe
 Finder Series, a yaoi manga by Ayano Yamane.
 Finder (website), an Australian comparison website
 FINDER, is the name of a Miniature unmanned aerial vehicle
 "Finder", an episode of the animated television series Lilo & Stitch: The Series

See also
The Finder (disambiguation), TV shows
Find (disambiguation)